Bois-Franc or Bois-Francs can refer to the following places, all in Quebec, Canada:
 Bois-Franc, Quebec, a municipality
 Bois-Franc, Montreal, a neighbourhood
 Bois-Francs, an alternate name for Centre-du-Québec region